Sally J. Toone is an American politician and educator, serving in the Idaho House of Representatives. A member of the Democratic Party, Toone represents District 26B.

Political career 

In October 2015, former District 26B representatives Donna Pence announced she would not seek reelection, and Toone ran for the open seat. She was unopposed in the Democratic primary, and defeated Republican Alex Sutter in the general election. She was reelected in 2018 and 2020, but did not file for reelection for 2022.

As of June 2020, Toone sits on the following committees:
 Agricultural Affairs
 Business
 Education

Electoral record

Personal life 

Toone was born in St. Maries, Idaho and holds a Bachelor of Science degree in Education from the University of Idaho. Her career includes working as a math teacher in the Wendell and Gooding school districts, and she is currently an Adult Educator and the College of Southern Idaho.

References 

Year of birth missing (living people)
Living people
Democratic Party members of the Idaho House of Representatives
21st-century American politicians
21st-century American women politicians
Women state legislators in Idaho